Willy Chavarria is an American fashion designer born in Fresno, California. He is the founder of his eponymous label (stylized as WILLY CHAVARRIA), and is the current Senior Vice President of Design at Calvin Klein.

Early life and education 
Chavarria was born to an Irish-American mother and a Mexican-American father in July, 1967. In his early 20's he attended the Academy of Art University in San Francisco to pursue a degree in graphics design. During his time in school, he found part-time employment for Joe Boxer working in the shipping department.

Career

Early beginnings 
During his employment at the Joe Boxer shipping department, Chavarria would spend time after hours to work on sketches and designs. This work secured him an internship with Nicholas Graham at Joe Boxer, and develops into a designer role for the company. After taking an interest in ahtletics and personal training, he takes a designer role for Voler, a cycling and multi-sport apparel company. At this time Ralph Lauren was forming a diffusion line for cycling apparel named RLX, and through a collaboration with Voler, Chavarria was hired to work on this new line in 1999.

Palmer Trading Company 
In November 2010, Chavarria and David Ramirez opened Palmer Trading Company as co-owners in New York City. The menswear store carried both vintage goods and contemporary pieces that complimented it's Americana aesthetic. The store's in-house label was also sold to retailers globally including Journal Standard Relume, Steven Alan, and Opening Ceremony. In 2015, the store collaborated with footwear manufacturer Viberg on an ankle height derby boot.

Willy Chavarria (eponymous label) 
He launched his eponymous label in 2015, and “from his casting to his designs, Mexican American designer Willy Chavarria has always knitted politics into fashion, and fought to see beauty where it is rarely recognized.” Since, his collection has been stocked at prestigious retailers worldwide, including Barneys, Dover Street Market, Browns, and many more. Chavarria became known for his distinct interpretation of men's fashion mixing race, politics, sexuality into graceful and elegant apparel. He was one of the first New York designers to cast only models of color and used his shows for political expression. In 2016 he showed his Spring/Summer collection at the Eagle Bar in New York City juxtaposed with religion, lowrider and leather bar influences. Pulitzer Prize-winning journalist Robin Givhan noted that Willy "produces some of the most socially engaging runway shows in New York." Willy also gained the attention of Vogue, with Nick Remsen noting that "Chavarria is a smart, worldly creative who knows how to be all-inclusive while still carving out his own distinct M.O." For his Spring/Summer 2019 Collection, Chavarria collaborated with sportswear brand Hummel. This collection references late 1990's/2000's streetwear seen in New York City through skyline graphics, inspiration from brands like Ralph Lauren and Calvin Klein, and inverted American flag prints. His work for this season would be featured at the Metropolitan Museum of Art exhibition titled, "In America: A Lexicon of Fashion." Chavarria's Fall 2020 collection features sustainable materials on the runway by collaborating with textile manufacturer Recyctex to reuse discarded fabric waste in his garments. The Spring 2022 runway collection highlights Chavarria's signature oversized sillouhuettes, subversive takes on masculinity, and roots in Chicano subculture. He stated, "I wanted it to feel like couture, to feel regal... and then to shift that against the toughness of New York." The collection also highlights an effort to utilize a made-to-order business model for higher end garments at the label to reduce fashion waste.

Awards and nominations 

 Woolmark Prize, Finalist, 2019.
 National Award for Fashion Design, Winner, 2022.
 Cooper Hewitt National Design Award, Winner, 2022.
 CDFA American Menswear Designer of the Year, Nominated, 2019.

Notable works 

 Creative consultant for Yeezy Gap.
 Collaboration with Danish brand Hummel in 2018.
 Collaboration with Danish workwear brand KANSAS in 2019.
 "Falling Stars" sweater, 2019
 K-Swiss collaborative footwear, 2020.
 Dickies collaboration for Willy Chavarria Fall 2022 menswear show "UNCUT".

External links 
 Willy Chavarria Spring 2018 "Cruising"
 Willy Chavarria Fall 2018 "Believers"
 Willy Chavarria Spring 2019
 WILLY x KANSAS, Fall 2019
 Willy Chavarria Spring 2020
 Willy Chavarria Fall 2020
 Willy Chavarria Fall 2021 "Real Men"
 Willy Chavarria Spring 2022 "Cut Deep"
 Willy Chavarria Fall 2022 "Uncut"
 Willy Chavarria Spring 2023

References

American fashion designers
American artists of Mexican descent
Living people
1967 births